Bernard Edward Ruelle (November 23, 1920 – August 4, 1995) was an American professional ice hockey winger who played two games in the National Hockey League with the Detroit Red Wings during the 1943–44 season. The rest of his career, which lasted from 1939 to 1947, was spent in the minor leagues.

Career statistics

Regular season and playoffs

External links

References 

1920 births
1995 deaths
American men's ice hockey forwards
Detroit Red Wings players
Fresno Falcons players
Ice hockey players from Michigan
Indianapolis Capitals players
People from Houghton, Michigan
Tacoma Rockets (WHL) players

People from Hancock, Michigan